The 1994 Spanish motorcycle Grand Prix was the fourth round of the 1994 Grand Prix motorcycle racing season. It took place on 8 May 1994 at the Circuito Permanente de Jerez.

500 cc classification

250 cc classification

125 cc classification

References

Spanish motorcycle Grand Prix
Spanish
Motorcycle Grand Prix